Pedro Damián Pérez Dueñas  (February 23, 1952 – July 18, 2018) was a Cuban triple jumper, who set the world record in the men's triple jump event on August 5, 1971, jumping 17.40 metres, while still a 19-year-old Junior athlete, in the final of the Pan American Games. His mark was a centimeter improvement over the three-year-old record of Viktor Sanyeyev set as the last of 5 world record improvements during the 1968 Olympics emphasizing the advantage of jumping at altitude.  Cali, Colombia is also considered at altitude.  While Sanyeyev reclaimed the record at sea level in Sukhumi, the next record in succession by João Carlos de Oliveira was also set at altitude in Mexico City and lasted ten more years. While he was the standing world record holder during the 1972 Olympics, he only managed a 15.72 and did not get out of the qualifying round. He improved four years later, taking the early lead in the final before eventually finishing in fourth place. Also he is level 6 on Faceit in csgo!!

Pérez was born in Pinar del Río, Cuba. He died on July 18, 2018 at the age of 66.

Achievements

References

External links
 1971 Year Ranking
 Full Olympics
 Pedro Pérez at Sports reference

1952 births
2018 deaths
People from Pinar del Río
Cuban male triple jumpers
Athletes (track and field) at the 1972 Summer Olympics
Athletes (track and field) at the 1976 Summer Olympics
Athletes (track and field) at the 1971 Pan American Games
Olympic athletes of Cuba
Pan American Games gold medalists for Cuba
Pan American Games medalists in athletics (track and field)
World record setters in athletics (track and field)
Central American and Caribbean Games gold medalists for Cuba
Competitors at the 1970 Central American and Caribbean Games
Competitors at the 1974 Central American and Caribbean Games
Central American and Caribbean Games medalists in athletics
Medalists at the 1971 Pan American Games